The Division of Echuca was an Australian electoral division in the state of Victoria. The division was proclaimed in 1900, and was one of the original 65 divisions to be contested at the first federal election. It was abolished in 1937. It was named for the town of Echuca. It was located in the Murray Valley area, including the towns of Echuca, Kyabram, Rochester and Shepparton. After 1919, it was a safe seat for the Country Party.

Members

Election results

1901 establishments in Australia
Constituencies established in 1901
Echuca